Menzies is a Scottish surname, also used as a given name.

Menzies  may also refer to:

Clan Menzies, Scottish clan
 Menzies Aviation, an Edinburgh-based business

Places

Australia
 Division of Menzies, electoral division, Melbourne, Australia
 Hundred of Menzies, a cadastral unit on Kangaroo Island in South Australia
 Menzies, Queensland, a suburb in the City of Mount Isa
 Menzies, Western Australia
 Shire of Menzies, Western Australia

Elsewhere
 Menzies Bay (British Columbia), Canada
 Mount Menzies, Antarctica
 Menzies Ferry, New Zealand